The sport of football in the country of Palestine is run by the Palestinian Football Association. The association administers the national football team as well as the West Bank Premier League. They are members of FIFA and the Asian Football Confederation. Women's football is popular also in Palestine. The opening match of the Palestine Women's National Football League on February 10, 2011, in the Feisal al-Husseini Stadium was attended by an estimated 8,000 people. The Women's league has six teams.
Football is the most popular sport in Palestine. Honey Thaljieh is a pioneer in women's football

History
The game was originally introduced during the time of the British Mandate. Palestine has one of the oldest histories of organized football in the Middle East with evidence of the game being played at an organized level amongst Palestinians youths since at least the early 1920s. Some notable clubs during the early years of Palestinian football were Shabab Al Arab of Haifa, the Orthodox Club of Jerusalem, and Islami Yaffa. During these years, Palestinian stars, such as Jabra Al-Zarqa, George Mardeni, and Majed Assad represented an excellence that was second to none. Jabra Al-Zarqa received an offer to play for Arsenal FC while playing in the British Army's Haifa League in 1945.

The Eretz Israel Football Association was formed in 1928 and joined FIFA in 1929. It is associated with the Israeli Football Association. At the time the association was made up of Arab clubs, Jewish clubs and clubs representing British policemen and soldiers serving in the region during the British Mandate rule that spanned the period between World War One and the independence of the state of Israel in 1948. The qualification matches for the 1934 and 1938 World Cups were contested by a Mandatory Palestine national football team made up exclusively of Jewish players.

Palestine applied to, and was admitted into FIFA in 1998. They played their first friendly matches against Lebanon, Jordan and Syria in July 1998. The following year, the team, led by Palestinian-Israeli coach Azmi Nasser took part in the 1999 Pan Arab Games, in which they won the bronze medal after beating Syria, Qatar, and the United Arab Emirates, while only losing to hosts Jordan.

Palestine football stadiums

References